Jesse James "Mountain" Hubbard (July 18, 1895 - January 14, 1982) was a Negro leagues pitcher from 1919 to 1935 who played most of his seasons with the Brooklyn Royal Giants.

He died in Los Angeles on January 14, 1982, and is buried at Riverside National Cemetery in Riverside, California.

References

External links
 and Baseball-Reference Black Baseball stats and Seamheads
  and Seamheads
 

Bacharach Giants players
Baltimore Black Sox players
Brooklyn Royal Giants players
Hilldale Club players
New York Black Yankees players
Negro league baseball managers
Burials at Riverside National Cemetery
People from Polk County, Texas
1895 births
1982 deaths
20th-century African-American sportspeople